The men's 400 metres T54 event at the 2020 Summer Paralympics in Tokyo, took place on 29 August 2021.

Records
Prior to the competition, the existing records were as follows:

Results

Heats
Heat 1 took place on 29 August 2021, at 11:43:

Heat 2 took place on 29 August 2021, at 11:51:

Heat 3 took place on 29 August 2021, at 11:59:

Final
The final took place on 29 August 2021, at 20:21:

References

Men's 400 metres T54
2021 in men's athletics